Six Feet Under is a soundtrack album to the HBO television series Six Feet Under, released in 2002 on Universal Music.

Track listing
 Thomas Newman, "Six Feet Under Title Theme" (1:36) • Plays at the start of every episode.
 Lamb, "Heaven" (4:58)• Plays in promotional trailers for the show, as well as season 2, episode 1.
 Stereo MCs, "Deep Down & Dirty" (4:22)
 Peggy Lee, "I Love Being Here With You" (2:44)
 P.J. Harvey, "One Time Too Many" (2:52)
 The Beta Band, "Squares" (3:44)
 Zero 7, "Distractions" (5:16)
 Shuggie Otis, "Inspiration Information" (4:10)
 The Dining Rooms, "Pure & Easy" (4:34)
 Craig Armstrong featuring Paul Buchanan, "Let's Go Out Tonight" (6:02)
 Classics IV, "Spooky" (2:50)
 The Dandy Warhols, "Bohemian Like You" (3:28)
 Orlando Cachaito Lopez, "Mis Dos Pequeñas" (4:04)
 The Devlins, "Waiting" (Tom Lord-Alge Remix) (4:51)• Plays in the ending sequence of the pilot episode.
 Thomas Newman, "Six Feet Under Title Theme" (Rae & Christian Remix) (5:19) • special bonus feature on DVD
 Thomas Newman, "Six Feet Under Title Theme" (Photek Remix) (5:08) • special bonus feature on DVD
 Julie London, "Yummy Yummy Yummy" (2:56)

References 

Six Feet Under (TV series)
Television soundtracks
2002 soundtrack albums
Universal Music Group soundtracks